Bassem Hemeida (born 28 March 2000 in Egypt) is a Qatari hurdler who specializes in the 400 metres hurdles.

He won the silver medal at the 2018 Asian Junior Championships and the 2018 World U20 Championships, and finished fourth at the 2019 Asian Championships. At the 2019 Asian Championships he also won a bronze medal in the 4 × 400 metres relay.

His personal best time is 49.45 seconds, achieved at the 2019 Asian Championships in Doha.

References

2000 births
Living people
Qatari male hurdlers
Qatari male sprinters